Chicago School of Architecture may refer to:

 Chicago school (architecture), an architectural aesthetic associated with the city of Chicago
 Chicago School of Architecture, founded by Louis Millet at the Art Institute of Chicago